The Latvian Men's Elite Floorball League also known as Elvi Floorball League for sponsorship reasons with Elvi, is the top men's floorball league in Latvia. There are 12 teams participating in the league.

Current clubs

List of champions

Performance by club

Bold indicates clubs currently playing in the top division.

Former teams
 Blāzma
 FK Rīga
 SK Latvijas Avīze
 Uzvara lauks
 Fk Tähe Jõgeva

Floorball in Latvia